The Dabeigou Formation is a palaeontological formation located in Hebei, China. It dates from the mid Valanginian to Hauterivian age of the Cretaceous period, approximately 135 to 130 Ma.

Fossil content 
Fossils include the confuciusornithiform bird Eoconfuciusornis. As of 2016 this is the oldest bird with a toothless beak known, but it belongs to a very ancestral avian lineage not closely related to living birds.
Birds
 Jinguofortis perplexus
Amphibians
 Regalerpeton weichangensis
Insects

 Amplicella beipiaoensis
 A. exquisita
 A. shcherbakovi
 Brachyopteryx weichangensis
 Chresmoda multinervis
 C. shihi
 Coptoclava longipoda
 Glypta qingshilaensis
 Hebeicoris xinboensis
 Jibeigomphus xinboensis
 Manlayamyia dabeigouensis
 Mesasimulium laihaigouense
 M. laiyangensis
 Mesolygaeus hebeiensis
 Mesoplecia xinboensis
 Pleciofungivora yangtianense
 Priscotendipes mirus
 Vitimoilus ovatus
 Zygadenia lenta
 Amplicella sp.
 Ichneumonidae indet.
 Tanychorinae indet.

See also 
 List of fossil sites

References

Bibliography

Further reading 
  (1993); Wildlife of Gondwana. Reed. 

Geologic formations of China
Lower Cretaceous Series of Asia
Hauterivian Stage
Valanginian Stage
Cretaceous China
Sandstone formations
Mudstone formations
Tuff formations
Conglomerate formations
Siltstone formations
Paleontology in Hebei